Semenkovich may refer to:

 Semenkovich, minor planet named after Nicholas Paul Semenkovich, ISEF awardee in 2003
 Vladimir Semenkovich (1861–1932), Russian ethnologist and archaeologist

Russian-language surnames